Carvel Rock (sometimes spelled Carval Rock) is an uninhabited islet of the US Virgin Islands in the Caribbean, less than  in size. It is visited by boats as a scuba diving site, but its sheer cliffs and lack of a beach mean that landing would be practically impossible. 

It lies immediately east of Lovango Cay and Congo Cay.

Carvel Rock appeared in the premiere episode of The Amazing Race 25, where the 11 competing teams had to climb across the top of the rock before jumping off into the ocean.

References

Uninhabited islands of the United States Virgin Islands